Subash may refer to:

 Kuldu or Subash, a village in Kyrgyzstan
 Subash (film), a 1996 Tamil action film